The 2009 Grand Prix de Futsal was the fifth edition of the international futsal competition of the same kind as the FIFA Futsal World Cup, but with invited nations and held annually in Brazil. It was first held in 2005.

First round

Group A

Group B

Group C

Group D

Classification 9th–16th

Classification 1st–8th

Winner

References

2009
2009 in Brazilian football
2009 in futsal